Georgios Abaris (born 23 April 1982) is a Greek former professional footballer who played as a goalkeeper.

Club career
Abaris previously played in the Greek Super League with Iraklis, AEL and Asteras Tripolis.

International career
Abaris competed for the Greece U-21 for the 2003 UEFA European Under-21 Championship qualification and for the U-23 at the 2004 Summer Olympics.

References

1982 births
Living people
Greek men's footballers
Greek expatriate footballers
Olympic footballers of Greece
Footballers at the 2004 Summer Olympics
Super League Greece players
Cypriot First Division players
Cypriot Second Division players
Liga I players
Iraklis Thessaloniki F.C. players
Asteras Tripolis F.C. players
Athlitiki Enosi Larissa F.C. players
FC Universitatea Cluj players
PAS Giannina F.C. players
Enosis Neon Paralimni FC players
Expatriate footballers in Cyprus
Expatriate footballers in Romania
Association football goalkeepers
Footballers from Naousa, Imathia